The fencing competitions at the 2018 Mediterranean Games took place on 24 and 25 June at the La Selva del Camp Pavilion in La Selva del Camp.

Athletes will compete in 4 events. There will be no team events.

Medal summary

Men's events

Women's events

Medal table

References

External links
2018 Mediterranean Games – Fencing

Sports at the 2018 Mediterranean Games
2018
Mediterranean Games